Bhagirathi Mahapatra was an Indian politician. He was a member of central legislative assembly from (1945-1947).He was a Member of Parliament, representing Odisha in the Rajya Sabha the upper house of India's Parliament as a member of the Indian National Congress.Sri Bhagirathi Mohapatra was also the founder secretary of Utkal Pradesh congress Committee (1921-1937) along with UtkalaMani Pandit Gopabandhu Das, who was also the Founder President. He was also one of the main trustee of Swaraj Ashram, Odisha (1940).

References

Rajya Sabha members from Odisha
Indian National Congress politicians
1892 births
Year of death missing
Indian National Congress politicians from Odisha